Ouwerx is a surname. Notable people with the surname include:

Jane Ouwerx (1870–1952), Belgian liberal and politician
John Ouwerx (1903–1983), Belgian jazz pianist and composer

Surnames of Belgian origin